A nöker was a member a group of military comrades in  medieval  Mongolian and Turkic armies. The word nöker means "comrade" in the Mongol language.

The nökers were led by a leader and they were loyal to their leader. These relationships lasted for life. In turn, the leader was responsible for maintaining the wealth of the nökers. The historian Halil İnalcık sees the nöker relationship as comparable to the commendatio or homage of the medieval armies in Europe.

Mongol armies
Nökers were an important element of the Mongol armies. But, the nökers also served other tasks. For example, Möngke Khan, the great khan of the Mongol Empire, tasked his nökers with tax collection and legation. Sometimes, nökers were appointed governor of the newly conquered territories too. Except in cases when they were assigned duties, they always accompanied their leader.

Seljuks of Anatolia
After the Mongol Empire, the nöker system was taken over by the Turkic states. The nöker concept was not much different than the Nöker of the Mongols. They accompanied their leader in war and peace. Sometimes, they were also tasked as local governors. For example, the founders of the Karesi and Saruhan beyliks were initially nökers of Mesut II of the Seljuks of Anatolia.

Ottoman Empire
In the early years of the Ottoman beylik (before independence), Osman I was one of the many ghazis. But, after his successful raids to Byzantine Empire territory, he became a leader, and his fellow ghazis became his nökers. Initially, his nökers were Turkmen ghazis. But, some Byzantine soldiers converted to Islam and among them some chose to be Osman's nökers as well. Köse Mihal was a well known example. The nöker system in the Ottoman Empire ended by the 16th century.

References

Medieval armies
Military history of the Mongol Empire
Anatolian beyliks
Military of the Ottoman Empire